Monilispira lysidia is a species of sea snail, a marine gastropod mollusc in the family Pseudomelatomidae.

Description
The length of the shell attains 9.8 mm.

Distribution
unknown.

References

 Chenu, 1850 - Parts 81. In Illustrations Conchyliologiques ou description et figures de toutes les coquilles connues vivantes et fossiles, classées suivant le système de Lamarck modifié d'après les progrès de la science et comprenant les genres nouveaux et les espèces récemment découvertes, p. Helix pl 3 ; Bulimus pl 8 ; Anodonta pl 3 ; Trochus pl 4 ; Columbella pl 26

External links
 MNHN: syntype of Columbella lysidia

lysidia
Gastropods described in 1850